Mentzelia congesta is a species of flowering plants in the family Loasaceae known by the common name united blazingstar.

Distribution
The plant is native to the western United States, from Idaho to California.

It grows in forest, scrub, chaparral, and woodland habitats.

Description
It is an annual herb producing a tan-colored erect stem up to 40 centimeters tall. The leaves are up to 9 centimeters long and may be smooth-edged or lobed.

The inflorescence is a dense cluster of flowers wrapped in wide, toothed bracts which are white in color with green tips. Each flower has five shiny yellow petals 3 to 9 millimeters long, each with an orange spot near the base.

The fruit is a narrow, straight utricle up to 12 millimeters in length. It contains many minute angular seeds with concave sides covered in tiny bumps.

References

External links
Jepson Manual Treatment: Mentzelia congesta
Mentzelia congesta — U.C. Photo gallery

congesta
Flora of the Western United States
Flora of California
Flora of Idaho
Flora of Nevada
Flora of the Great Basin
Flora of the California desert regions
Flora of the Sierra Nevada (United States)
Natural history of the Peninsular Ranges
Taxa named by Thomas Nuttall
Flora without expected TNC conservation status